Ancient synagogues in Israel refers to synagogues in the modern State of Israel, built by the Jewish and Samaritan communities from antiquity to the Early Islamic period.

The designation ancient synagogues in Israel requires careful definition. Many very old synagogues have been discovered in archaeological digs. Some synagogues have been destroyed and rebuilt several times on the same site, so, while the site or congregation may be ancient, the building may be modern.

Archaeologists have uncovered many remains of synagogues from over two thousand years ago, including several that were in use before the destruction of the Temple in Jerusalem. Synagogues securely dated to before the destruction of the Temple in Jerusalem include the two synagogues from Migdal, probably a synagogue at Capernaum,, the synagogues at Modi'in and Modi'in Illit, and the small synagogue at the top of Masada. The Theodotos Synagogue Inscription from Jerusalem is usually considered to have come from a synagogue of the Second Temple period as well, although the associated building has not been discovered.

Numerous inscriptions have been found in the ancient synagogues in Israel the vast majority, 140, of these are in Aramaic, with another 50 in Greek and only a few in Hebrew.

Modi'in synagogue (2nd century BCE)
Discovered at Umm el-Umdan, a site between Modi'in and Latrun, is the oldest synagogue within modern Israel that has been found to date, which existed between the end of the 2nd and the late 1st century BCE, during the Hasmonean period. It was rebuilt in the late 1st century BCE during the Herodian period. This second phase includes a nearby mikve, additional to the preserved sitting bath in the courtyard, which existed already during the first phase.

For the nearby Qiryat Sefer/Modi'in Illit synagogue (1st century BCE) at Khirbet Badd 'Isa, Ascent of Beth-Horon, see here and here.

Nabratein/Naburiya synagogue

Naburiya was a Jewish village in the Galilee during the First and Second Temple periods. Neburaya is believed to be identical with Nabratein, a location north of Safed where Eleazar of Modi'im and Jacob of Kfar Neburaya, a compiler of the Haggadah, are buried.

The remains of the Nabratein synagogue, discovered in archaeological excavations, indicate that it is one of the oldest in the Galilee. The original synagogue was enlarged during the third century and destroyed in an earthquake in 363 CE. In 564, the synagogue was rebuilt. The date is known from the inscription over the main door, now displayed at the Israel Museum: "Built four hundred and ninety four years after the destruction of the Temple under the leadership of Hanina ben Lizar and Luliana bar Yuden [92 BCE]." The second-phase building stood until 640 CE. The façade was partially reconstructed by the Jewish National Fund and the Israel Antiquities Authority.

Synagogues rebuilt on ancient sites 
Several synagogues in Israel are located on the sites of far older synagogue buildings but, because the older buildings were destroyed by non-Jewish rulers of the city, the present buildings are reconstructions.

Ancient synagogue sites

See also
 Ancient synagogues in Palestine covers modern Israel, West Bank, Gaza, Golan Heights, and Transjordan
 Archaeology of Israel

References 

 

Archaeological sites in Israel